North Dakota held two statewide elections in 2018: a primary election on Tuesday, June 12, and a general election on Tuesday, November 6. In addition, each township elected officers on Tuesday, March 20, and each school district held their elections on a date of their choosing between April 1 and June 30.

Primary Election
On Tuesday, June 12, North Dakota voters selected which candidates for statewide and legislative office will appear on the November ballot. Because North Dakota does not have party registration, any eligible voter may vote in any one party's primary election. Though primary elections often include any number of constitutional amendments, initiated measures, or referred measures placed on the ballot by petition, none were included in this particular election.

General Election
On Tuesday, November 6, concurrent with other statewide elections across the United States, North Dakota voters selected one United States Senator, one United States Representative, Secretary of State, Attorney General, and several other statewide executive and judicial branch offices. Voters in odd-numbered legislative districts also selected their representatives to the North Dakota House of Representatives and North Dakota Senate. Finally, voters faced four ballot measures.

United States Senator

Incumbent Democratic–NPL Senator Heidi Heitkamp ran for reelection to a second term, but was defeated by Republican United States Representative Kevin Cramer.

United States Representative

Though incumbent Republican Kevin Cramer had announced that he would run for re-election to a fourth term, he later decided to run for the Senate instead. Republican state Senator Kelly Armstrong defeated Democratic-NPL former state Senate Minority Leader Mac Schneider for the open seat.

Secretary of State

Six-term incumbent Republican Secretary of State Alvin Jaeger was not re-endorsed by his party to serve a seventh term, so did not run for his party's nomination. When nominated Republican Will Gardner withdrew from the general election, Jaeger collected enough valid signatures to appear on the ballot as an independent. No candidate appeared on the ballot with the label of Republican.

The incumbent defeated two challengers, including two-term Democratic-NPL state representative Joshua Boschee.

Governing magazine projected the race as being a likely victory for Jaeger.

Attorney General
Incumbent Republican Attorney General Wayne Stenehjem won re-election against his Democratic-NPL challenger, trial attorney David Thompson.

Other statewide races
All North Dakota voters faced partisan races for Agriculture Commissioner, Tax Commissioner, one full term seat and one partial term seat on the Public Service Commission, and a nonpartisan ten-year term as Justice of the Supreme Court

State legislative races
24 seats in the North Dakota Senate and 48 seats in the North Dakota House of Representatives were up for election. Voters in all odd-numbered districts had those races on their ballot.

Measures
Voters faced four measures placed on the ballot by petition. They passed Measure 1, which will establish government ethics rules and an ethics commission; the Secretary of State approved it for the ballot on July 24. They also passed Measure 2, which removes language in the state constitution currently guaranteeing all citizens to right to vote and replaces it with language banning non-citizens from voting; it had been approved on August 10. Measure 3 would have legalized the recreational use of marijuana, but was not passed. They did, however, approve Measure 4, which establishes personalized vehicle plates for volunteer emergency responders.

References

External links
Candidates at Vote Smart 
Candidates at Ballotpedia
Campaign finance at OpenSecrets

Official Attorney General campaign websites
Wayne Stenehjem (R) for Attorney General
David Thompson (D) for Attorney General

Official Agriculture Commissioner campaign websites
Jim Dotzenrod (D) for Agriculture Commissioner
Doug Goehring (R) for Agriculture Commissioner

Official Tax Commissioner campaign websites
Kylie Oversen (D) for Tax Commissioner
Ryan Rauschenberger (R) for Tax Commissioner

Official Public Service Commission campaign websites
Randy Christmann (R) for Public Service Commission

Official Public Service Commission (Unexpired two-year term) campaign websites
Casey Buchmann (D) for Public Service Commission
Brian Kroshus (R) for Public Service Commission

 
North Dakota